At the Cat's Cradle, 1992 is the sixth live album by the American rock band Ween. It was released on November 25, 2008 on Chocodog Records.

The 2-disc package includes a CD containing a live performance from December 9, 1992 at the Cat's Cradle in Carrboro, NC. The bonus DVD contains other live performances from 1992, including clips from Ween's first tour of the Netherlands.

Track listing (CD)
All tracks written by Ween.

Track listing (DVD)

Personnel 

 Dean Ween, pseudonym for Mickey Melchiondo – lead guitar, vocals
 Gene Ween, pseudonym for Aaron Freeman – lead vocal, guitar
 Aaron Tanner - art direction, design

References

2008 live albums
2008 video albums
Live video albums
Ween live albums
Ween video albums